Joseph James "J.J." Killeen (born October 22, 1981) is an American professional golfer.

Killeen was born in San Diego, California. He played college golf at Texas Christian University. He turned professional in 2005.

Killeen played on mini-tours, including the Tight Lies Tour (winning once) and the NGA Hooters Tour before joining the Nationwide Tour in 2008.

Killeen made it to the final round of 2010 Q School, but missed earning a tour card by a single stroke.

Killeen won his first Nationwide Tour event in 2011 at the Utah Championship. He won again the following week at the Cox Classic in Nebraska. Killeen ended the 2011 season as the top money earner on the Nationwide Tour, which grants him a full-season exemption on the PGA Tour for 2012, a spot in The Players Championship, and exemption from the reshuffle. He was also voted the Nationwide Tour Player of the Year.

Killeen made his PGA Tour debut at the Sony Open in Hawaii, where he finished T38.

Professional wins (4)

Nationwide Tour wins (2)

Nationwide Tour playoff record (0–1)

Other wins (2)
2005 High Meadows Ranch Classic (Tight Lies Tour)
2021 The Joyce Crane | Veritex Bank Section Championship

Results in The Players Championship

CUT = missed the halfway cut

See also
2011 Nationwide Tour graduates

References

External links

American male golfers
TCU Horned Frogs men's golfers
PGA Tour golfers
Korn Ferry Tour graduates
Golfers from San Diego
Golfers from Texas
Sportspeople from Fort Worth, Texas
1981 births
Living people